Sammy Sosa High Heat Baseball 2001 is a video game released in 2000, and is the third game in the High Heat Major League Baseball video game series. It was the first game in the series to feature then-Chicago Cubs right fielder Sammy Sosa on the cover.

Gameplay

Reception

The PC version received "favorable" reviews, while the PlayStation version received "mixed" reviews, according to the review aggregation website GameRankings. GamePro called the PC version "a good game that's left on the verge of becoming a great one."

Brad Cook of AllGame gave the PC version four stars out of five, saying that it was "definitely worth picking up if you're a diehard baseball fan. The ability to play out current players' careers and get them into the Hall of Fame while nurturing the paths of newcomers is worth the purchase price alone." However, Mark Kanarick gave the PlayStation version three-and-a-half stars, saying, "Sammy Sosa High Heat Baseball 2001 is really on its way up. If the developers can take care of some control issues for next year's version, they may really have a winner to compete with the 'Big Two.'"

The staff of Computer Games Magazine nominated the PC version for their 2000 "Sports Game of the Year" award, whose winner remains unknown. It won the award for Sports at Computer Gaming Worlds 2001 Premier Awards. The game was a runner-up for GameSpys "2000 Sports Game of the Year", which went to PGA Championship Golf 2000. The staff called it "the best action baseball game to ever grace a PC."

Notes

References

External links
 

2000 video games
Major League Baseball video games
PlayStation (console) games
The 3DO Company games
Video games based on real people
Video games developed in the United States
Windows games